The Richtersveld gecko (Pachydactylus carinatus) is a species of lizard in the family Gekkonidae. It is found in South Africa and Namibia.

References

Pachydactylus
Reptiles described in 2006
Reptiles of South Africa
Reptiles of Namibia
Taxa named by William Roy Branch